Meet the Wife is a 1960s BBC situation comedy written by Chesney and Wolfe, which featured Freddie Frinton as Freddie Blacklock with Thora Hird as his tyrannical wife, Thora. It ran for five series.

The series was based on a 1963 BBC television Comedy Playhouse production, "The Bed". The theme tune was by Russ Conway and incidental music by Norman Percival and later Dennis Wilson. The producers were John Paddy Carstairs and later Robin Nash.

Outline
The series followed the various ups and downs of a middle-aged married couple, Freddie and Thora Blacklock. Of the two, Fred played the "straight man", weary under Thora's nagging. He was a plumber who liked a bit of betting and a drink before coming home. His wife, Thora, was noted for her incessant talking while giving her husband a hard time. The couple had at least two children, one named Peter who was 23 and married.

Apart from one, the catchphrases of the series belonged to Thora. The first occurred whenever the socially-aspiring Thora introduced her husband, when she would snobbishly pronounce his name "Frayed", remarking that he was "a Master plumber", with the emphasis on the word Master. The other was to throw an irate accusative tantrum at poor, downtrodden Fred, with the words, "Every time [such-and-such happens], you always go berserk" The word berserk was given great emphasis, as "Ber-Serk", and always had a successful comedic effect as Fred would wilt under the onslaught. She would also answer the phone with an affected "Hellewe", generally half way through an angry rant at Fred.

Fred also had a catchphrase; always uttering an affected, over-the-top, supposed-upper class "Yai-sss", accompanied by tilted head, sycophantic smile and rapid eye-blinking, in response to Thora's request for confirmation (e.g. "Isn't that right, Fred?") on some point she was making to any member of the group she was aspiring to equal socially.

The series has much in common with the later BBC sitcom Keeping Up Appearances, except that the central couple were unmistakably working class while in Appearances social climbing was a central element of the programme.

Episodes

Pilot
The pilot episode, titled "The Bed", was first broadcast in series three of Comedy Playhouse on 28 December 1963.

Fred and Thora have been using the same bed for 25 years and it is lumpy and past its best. Thora decides it's time to get not just a new bed but two separate beds, because Fred keeps taking the bed clothes, etc. However two beds cost much more than one so she settles on a nice bed but that night makes Fred's life a nightmare as she tries to get settled, so Fred goes to the spare room to sleep on the old bed. While still nagging him though he's now in another room, Thora finds his present and card for their Silver Anniversary tomorrow, costing the £15 she thought he'd wasted. She grabs the bed clothes and goes to the other room and gets in bed with Fred. Brian Oulton was the bed salesman.

Series 1

Series 2

Series 3

Series 4

Series 5

 There was also a "Meet the Wife" sketch on BBC's Christmas Night with the Stars for 1964.

Surviving episodes 

In common with many other British television series of this era, not all episodes have survived. Only 17 episodes exist in the BBC archives as of June 2020. The following are currently thought to exist:

 Pilot
 Series 1: 1-7
 Series 2: 1-2
 Series 4: 1-6
 Series 5: 7

The first and the fourth series both exist in their entirety (as does the original pilot episode) but Series 2 (of which only the first two episodes remain) and Series 5 (of which only one episode exists) remain incomplete with the entire third series still missing from the TV archives as of 2020.

DVD release 
A DVD, (consisting of the remaining episodes of the series) was released on 24 October 2016.

In popular culture 
The series' title is mentioned in The Beatles' 1967 song "Good Morning, Good Morning".

References

External links
 
 

1963 British television series debuts
1966 British television series endings
1960s British sitcoms
BBC television sitcoms
Comedy Playhouse
Black-and-white British television shows
English-language television shows
Lost BBC episodes